Mehmet Pashë Deralla (1843 - 1918) was an Ottoman Albanian military officer and civil servant, and one of the delegates of the Albanian Declaration of Independence. Deralla served as Minister of War in the Provisional Government of Albania. He was a major figure of anti-Ottoman uprisings, and also opposed Serbian and Montenegrin encroachments.

Biography

Early life
Mehmet Deralla was born in 1843, the year of the Uprising of Dervish Cara, in Gradec, Gostivar. He was the son of noted Albanian patriot, Hasan Deralla. He went to maktab in Tetovo and completed secondary education in Skopje and Manastir. Deralla did his tertiary education at the Military Academy of Istanbul. After graduating with top marks, Deralla served in the infantry regiment in Anatolia. After serving for several years, Deralla was promoted to the General Staff and was given the title of Pasha.

Ottoman duty
Deralla served as the general of the gendarmerie and exercised high military functions in Baghdad, later in Aleppo and than finally Selanik. After serving in Salonika, Deralla moved to Uskub where he commanded the Prizren Vilayet. Shortly after, Deralla ended his career as General in the Ottoman army.

The Albanian uprising
Deralla changed allegiance when using his influence, lifted protests in Kosovo and joined the 
Volunteer Army of the League of Prizren. Mehmet Deralla was appointed adviser to Sulejman Vokshi, who was the Defence minister of the cabinet.

The Prizren League had 16,000 armed members under its control, who launched a revolution against the Ottoman Empire after the debacle at the Congress of Berlin and the official dissolution of the League ordered by the Ottomans who feared the League would seek total independence from the empire. The Albanian rebels were able to kill Mehmed Ali Pasha, the Turkish emissary, in Yakova in August 1878. The Ottoman Empire sought to suppress the League and they dispatched an army led by Turkish commander Dervish Pasha, that by April 1881 had captured Prizren and crushed the resistance at Ulcinj.

After escaping arrest by the Ottoman authority, Deralla went to contribute his services to the League of Peja, a political organization established in 1899 in the city of Peja. It was led by Haxhi Zeka, a former member of the League of Prizren. However, like the League of Prizren, the League of Peja was stopped by Ottoman forces. During the crisis, Deralla was detained by government forces and was exiled to the deserts of Iraq. Deralla returned to Kosovo due to receiving amnesty after the Young Turks uprising.
 
With the Ottoman empire deteriorating, the Ottomans offered Deralla a position again in the Ottoman army. 
However, Deralla refused stating that he already belongs to another cause. Deralla ran major uprisings in Kosovo from 1910 to 1912, where the battles that culminated in the summer of 1912, marked the taking of Skopje, the former Kosovo vilayet center. The focus of their movement in this period was decided by disregarding the hegemony of neighboring states Serbia, Montenegro, Bulgaria and Greece, which already invested their strategy, was to deny the existence of the Albanian nation. Deralla was one of the main protagonists of resistance attacks against Serbia and Montenegro, who aimed at conquering northern Albania. Under Deralla's command, the Albanian rebels, managed to push back Serb forces in the space between the White Drin and Black Drin.

Albanian Declaration of Independence

Deralla was one of eighty-three leaders meeting in Vlora in November 1912 to declare Albania an independent country and set up a provisional government. Deralla was a member of the Kosovo delegation. Isa Boletini suggested that Deralla serve as Minister of War in the Provisional Government of Albania in which Deralla accepted.

World War I and death
World War I interrupted all government activities in Albania, and the country was split into a number of regional governments. Political chaos engulfed Albania after the outbreak of World War I. Deralla was involved with the Kachak guerrilla movement against Serbia. He was captured by Serbian forces in 1916 and was imprisoned for a year and a half in Belgrade and Podgorica where he was poisoned.

References

19th-century Albanian people
20th-century Albanian people
People from Kosovo vilayet
1918 deaths
1843 births
Albanian Pashas
All-Albanian Congress delegates
Albanian Sufis
19th-century Ottoman military personnel
Albanian military personnel
20th-century Ottoman military personnel
Ottoman military personnel of the Balkan Wars